William John Lewthwaite was a British film editor. Lewthwaite died on 16 June 2011 at the age of 86.

Selected filmography
 Into the Blue (1950)
 Odette (1950)
 Derby Day (1952)
 Trent's Last Case (1952)
 Front Page Story (1954)
 Burnt Evidence (1954)
 That Woman Opposite (1957)
 The Naked Truth (1957)
 Too Many Crooks (1959)
 The Spider's Web (1960)
 On the Beat (1962)
 Panic (1963)
 Mystery Submarine (1963)
 Half a Sixpence (1967)
 The Royal Hunt of the Sun (1969)
 Dulcima (1971)

References

External links
 

Year of birth missing
2011 deaths
British film editors